Emrys Roberts (1929 – 30 March 2012) was a Welsh language poet and author, who was Archdruid of the National Eisteddfod of Wales.

Born in Liverpool, Roberts grew up in Penrhyndeudraeth and studied at the Bangor Normal College before becoming a teacher.  He twice won the chair at the National Eisteddfod of Wales, in 1967 and 1971. In 1987 he was made Archdruid and led the Gorsedd of Bards at the National Eisteddfod between 1987 and 1990 under the bardic name Emrys Deudraeth.

References

1929 births
2012 deaths
Bards of the Gorsedd
Chaired bards
Welsh-language writers
Welsh writers
Welsh Eisteddfod archdruids
Welsh Eisteddfod winners
20th-century Welsh poets
21st-century Welsh poets
21st-century British male writers
20th-century British male writers